Liao Fan (born 14 February 1974) is a Chinese film and theatre actor. He is a graduate of Shanghai Theatre Academy. In February 2014 he won the Silver Bear for Best Actor at the 64th Berlin International Film Festival, for his performance in the film Black Coal, Thin Ice (directed by Diao Yinan).

Filmography

Film

Television series

Awards

References

External links
 

1974 births
Living people
Shanghai Theatre Academy alumni
Male actors from Changsha
Silver Bear for Best Actor winners
Best Actor Asian Film Award winners
Chinese male stage actors
21st-century Chinese male actors
20th-century Chinese male actors
Chinese male film actors
Chinese male television actors